Sisseton is a city in Roberts County, South Dakota, United States. The population was 2,479 at the 2020 census. It is the county seat of Roberts County. Sisseton is the home to a number of tourist attractions, including the Nicollet Tower, and is near the "Song to the Great Spirit" building on the Sisseton Wahpeton College campus. The city is named for the Sisseton (or Sissetowan) division of the Native American Sioux. It also serves as an important part of the Lake Traverse Indian Reservation.

Geography
Sisseton is located at  (45.663259, −97.049040).

Sisseton has been assigned the ZIP code 57262 and the FIPS place code 59260.

Climate

Notes

Demographics

2010 census
As of the census of 2010, there were 2,470 people, 958 households, and 576 families living in the city. The racial makeup of the city was 47.0% White, 0.1% African American, 47.8% Native American, 0.4% Asian, 0.2% from other races, and 4.5% from two or more races. Hispanic or Latino of any race were 1.6% of the population.

There were 958 households, of which 36.3% had children under the age of 18 living with them, 34.2% were married couples living together, 17.1% had a female householder with no husband present, 8.8% had a male householder with no wife present, and 39.9% were non-families. 34.9% of all households were made up of individuals, and 16.3% had someone living alone who was 65 years of age or older. The average household size was 2.48 and the average family size was 3.22.

The median age in the city was 34.6 years. 29.7% of residents were under the age of 18; 9% were between the ages of 18 and 24; 22.1% were from 25 to 44; 21.9% were from 45 to 64; and 17.4% were 65 years of age or older. The gender makeup of the city was 48.1% male and 51.9% female.

2000 census
As of the census of 2000, there were 2,572 people, 1,003 households, and 631 families living in the city. The population density was 1,636.7 people per square mile (632.5/km2). There were 1,093 housing units at an average density of 695.5 per square mile (268.8/km2). The racial makeup of the city was 56.07% White, 0.12% African American, 40.86% Native American, 0.27% Asian, 0.04% from other races, and 2.64% from two or more races. Hispanic or Latino of any race were 1.09% of the population.

There were 1,003 households, out of which 31.9% had children under the age of 18 living with them, 38.9% were married couples living together, 16.9% had a female householder with no husband present, and 37.0% were non-families. 34.6% of all households were made up of individuals, and 16.2% had someone living alone who was 65 years of age or older. The average household size was 2.46 and the average family size was 3.12.

In the city, the population was spread out, with 29.3% under the age of 18, 8.2% from 18 to 24, 23.3% from 25 to 44, 20.8% from 45 to 64, and 18.4% who were 65 years of age or older. The median age was 36 years. For every 100 females, there were 88.8 males. For every 100 females age 18 and over, there were 86.2 males.

As of 2000 the median income for a household in the city was $26,698, and the median income for a family was $33,977. Males had a median income of $27,393 versus $20,586 for females. The per capita income for the city was $14,019. About 14.9% of families and 18.4% of the population were below the poverty line, including 23.6% of those under age 18 and 16.4% of those age 65 or over.

Education
Sisseton Wahpeton College, a small college that is part of Sisseton Wahpeton Oyate, is near Sisseton in Agency Village. The college offers undergraduate and vocational degrees. About 80% of the college's 250 students are Dakota people.

Sisseton School District 54-9 has four schools: Sisseton High School, Sisseton Middle School, New Effington Elementary and Westside Elementary.

Media

FM radio

Notable people
 Greg Long, musician
 Lowell Lundstrom, nationally known American evangelist and musician
 "Mean" Gene Okerlund, professional wrestling interviewer
 Gabriel Renville, last chief of the Sisseton-Wahpeton Sioux tribe
 Joe Robbie, original owner of the Miami Dolphins
 Floyd Westerman, actor

References

External links
 City of Sisseton

Cities in Roberts County, South Dakota
Cities in South Dakota
County seats in South Dakota
Populated places established in 1907
1907 establishments in South Dakota
Sisseton Wahpeton Oyate
South Dakota placenames of Native American origin